Granville is a city in McHenry County, North Dakota, United States. The population was 240 at the 2020 census. It is part of the Minot Micropolitan Statistical Area. Granville was founded in 1900.

History
Granville was laid out and platted in 1900. The city was named in honor of Granville M. Dodge, a railroad man. The railroad was extended to Granville in 1904, and the city was incorporated in 1906.

In the late 1990s, the town agreed to temporarily change its name to McGillicuddy City, in a promotion for Dr. McGillicuddy's schnapps.

Geography
Granville is located at  (48.266566, -100.843355).

Demographics

2010 census
As of the census of 2010, there were 241 people, 109 households, and 65 families residing in the city. The racial makeup of the city was 97.1% White, 1.2% Native American, 0.4% Asian, and 1.2% from two or more races. Hispanic or Latino of any race were 3.3% of the population.

There were 109 households, of which 28.4% had children under the age of 18 living with them, 45.9% were married couples living together, 10.1% had a female householder with no husband present, 3.7% had a male householder with no wife present, and 40.4% were non-families. 37.6% of all households were made up of individuals, and 18.3% had someone living alone who was 65 years of age or older. The average household size was 2.21 and the average family size was 2.91.

The median age in the city was 44.3 years. 21.6% of residents were under the age of 18; 5.4% were between the ages of 18 and 24; 24.6% were from 25 to 44; 28.6% were from 45 to 64; and 19.9% were 65 years of age or older. The gender makeup of the city was 50.2% male and 49.8% female.

2000 census
As of the census of 2000, there were 286 people, 120 households, and 77 families residing in the city. The population density was 1,042.5 people per square mile (409.0/km2). There were 141 housing units at an average density of 514.0 per square mile (201.6/km2). The racial makeup of the city was 96.50% White, 0.35% African American, 0.70% Native American, and 2.45% from two or more races.

There were 120 households, out of which 34.2% had children under the age of 18 living with them, 55.8% were married couples living together, 6.7% had a female householder with no husband present, and 35.8% were non-families. 30.0% of all households were made up of individuals, and 17.5% had someone living alone who was 65 years of age or older. The average household size was 2.38 and the average family size was 3.04.

In the city, the population was spread out, with 26.6% under the age of 18, 8.4% from 18 to 24, 24.5% from 25 to 44, 19.9% from 45 to 64, and 20.6% who were 65 years of age or older. The median age was 38 years. For every 100 females, there were 108.8 males. For every 100 females age 18 and over, there were 100.0 males.

The median income for a household in the city was $24,444, and the median income for a family was $28,500. Males had a median income of $27,500 versus $14,464 for females. The per capita income for the city was $14,576. About 7.5% of families and 9.9% of the population were below the poverty line, including 13.3% of those under the age of eighteen and 10.5% of those 65 or over.

Climate
This climatic region is typified by large seasonal temperature differences, with warm to hot (and often humid) summers and cold (sometimes severely cold) winters.  According to the Köppen Climate Classification system, Granville has a humid continental climate, abbreviated "Dfb" on climate maps.

Granville North Dakota holds 12 hour temperature rise record 

In 12 hours: 83°F, Granville, N.D., Feb. 21, 1918, from –33°F to 50°F from early morning to late afternoon.

Historic Places

The Granville State Bank, on Main Street, was built in 1903 and is listed on the National Register of Historic Places.

References

External links
 Granville, North Dakota 58741

Cities in North Dakota
Cities in McHenry County, North Dakota
Populated places established in 1900
1900 establishments in North Dakota
Minot, North Dakota micropolitan area